Rapport is a close and harmonious relationship in which the people or groups concerned are "in sync" with each other, understand each other's feelings or ideas, and communicate smoothly.

The word stems from the French verb  which means literally to carry something back. In the sense of how people relate to each other means that what one person sends out the other sends back. For example, they may realize that they share similar values, beliefs, knowledge, or behaviors around politics, music or sports. This may also mean that the participants engage in reciprocal behaviors such as posture mirroring or in increased coordination in their verbal and nonverbal interactions.

There are a number of techniques that are supposed to be beneficial in building rapport such as: matching your body language (i.e., posture, gesture, etc.); indicating attentiveness through maintaining eye contact; and matching tempo, terminology, and breathing rhythm. In conversation, some verbal behaviors associated with increased rapport are the use of positivity (or, positive "face management"), sharing personal information of gradually increasing intimacy (or, "self-disclosure"), and by referring to shared interests or experiences.

Rapport has been shown to have benefits for psychotherapy and medicine, negotiation, education, and tourism, among others. In each of these cases, the rapport between members of a dyad (e.g. a teacher and student or doctor and patient) allows the participants to coordinate their actions and establish a mutually beneficial working relationship, or what is often called a "working alliance". In guided group activities (e.g., a cooking class, a wine tour and hiking group), rapport is not only dyadic and customer-employee oriented, but also customer-customer and group-oriented as customers consume and interact with each other in a group for an extended period.

Building 
To achieve the benefits of interpersonal rapport in domains like education, medicine, or even sales, several methods have been shown to build rapport between people. These methods include coordination, showing your attentiveness to the other, building commonality, and managing the other's self-perception (also called "face" management). Building rapport can improve community based research tactics, assist in finding a partner, improve student-teacher relationships, and allow employers to gain trust in employees.

Building rapport takes time. Extroverts tend to have an easier time building rapport than introverts. Extraversion accelerates the process due to an increase in confidence and skillfulness in social settings.

Methods

Coordination 
Coordination, also called "mirroring" means getting into rhythm with another person, or coordinating one's verbal or nonverbal behaviors.
 Emotional mirroring – Empathizing with someone's emotional state by being on 'their side'. You must apply the skill of being a good listener in this situation so as you can listen for key words and problems that arise when speaking with the person. This is so you can talk about these issues and question them to better your understanding of what they are saying and show your empathy towards them.
 Posture mirroring – Matching the tone of a person's body language not through direct imitation, as this can appear as mockery, but through mirroring the general message of their posture and energy.
 Tone and tempo mirroring – Matching the tone, tempo, inflection, and volume of a person's voice.

Mutual attentiveness 
Another way of building rapport is by each partner indicating their attentiveness to the other. This attentiveness may take the form of nonverbal attentiveness, such as looking at the other person, nodding at appropriate moments, or physical proximity, as seen in work on teachers' "immediacy" behaviors in the classroom. This attentiveness might also be demonstrated through reciprocation of nonverbal behaviors like smiling or nodding, similar to the coordination or in the reciprocal sharing of personal details about the other person that signal one's knowledge and attentiveness to their needs.

Commonality 
Commonality is the technique of deliberately finding something in common with a person or a customer in order to build a sense of camaraderie and trust.
This is done through references to shared interests, dislikes, and experiences. By sharing personal details or self-disclosing personal preferences or information, interlocutors can build commonality, and thus increase rapport.

Face management 
Another way of building rapport is through what is often referred to as "positive face management", but may also simply be called positivity. According to some psychologists, we have a need to be seen in a positive light, known as our "face". By managing each other's "face", boosting it when necessary, or reducing negative impacts to it, we are able to build rapport with others.

Benefits
There have been a number of proposed benefits from building interpersonal rapport, which all revolve around smoother interactions, improved collaboration, and improved interpersonal outcomes, though the specifics differ by the domain. These domains include but are not limited to healthcare, education, business, and social relationships.

In the health domain, provider-patient rapport is often called the "Therapeutic Alliance" or "Therapeutic Relationship", and is a measure of the collaboration quality between provider and patient, often used as a predictor of therapy outcomes or patients' treatment adherence.

In education, teacher-student rapport is predictive of students' participation in the course, their course retention, likelihood to take a course in that domain again, and has sometimes been used to predict course outcomes. Some have argued that teacher-student rapport is an essential element of what makes an effective teacher, or the ability to manage interpersonal relationships and build a positive, pro-social, atmosphere of trust and reduced anxiety. Student-student rapport, on the other hand, while largely out of the teacher's ability to control, is also predictive of reduced anxiety in the course, feelings of a supportive class culture, and improved participation in class discussions. In these relationships, intentionally building rapport through individual meetings has shown an increase in student engagement and level of comfort in the classroom.

In negotiation, rapport is beneficial for reaching mutually beneficial outcomes, as partners are more likely to trust each other and be willing to cooperate and reach a positive outcome. However, others have found that interpersonal rapport in negotiation can lead to unethical behavior, particularly in impasse situations, where the interpersonal rapport may influence the negotiators to behave unethically.

In terms of social relationships such as friendship and romantic relationships, establishing a rapport can build trust and increase the feeling of closeness and eliminate certain misunderstandings. Rapport is necessary in establishing satisfaction and understanding acceptable behaviors in an interpersonal relationship. Friendships and romantic relationships can overlap with other domains.

Studying
To better study how rapport can lead to the above benefits, researchers generally adopt one of three main approaches: self-report surveys given to the participants, third-party observations from a naive observer, and some form of automated computational detection, using computer vision and machine learning.

Self-report surveys typically consist of a set of questions given at the end of the interaction, asking the participants to reflect on their relationship with another person and rate various aspects of that relationship, typically on a Likert scale. Though this is the most common approach, it suffers from unreliability of self-report data, such as the issue of separating participants' reflection on a single interaction with their relationship with the other person more broadly.

To address these issues, others have used a third-party observer to give a rating of the rapport to a particular segment of the interaction, often called a "slice". Other recent work uses techniques from computer vision, machine learning, and artificial intelligence to computationally detect the level of rapport between members of a dyad.

Rapport and Technology 
In the 21st century, online communication has had a huge impact on how business is conducted and how relationships are formed. In the era of Covid-19 and the shift to remote work and schooling, the way in which rapport is built has evolved. Communicating solely through online channels has been found to result in challenges related to rapport building. Challenges included technical difficulties interrupting video calls and direct messaging, interruptions and distractions from the user's home, a lack of intimacy and the ability to observe one another, lack of eye contact, mundane interactions, and the 'pressure of presence.'

See also 

 Empathy
 Facial resemblance
 Grok
 Mirroring in psychology

References

Further reading 
  Chapter 8. Communicating to establish rapport – Patient Practitioner Interaction: An Experiential Manual for Developing the Art of Health Care. Carol M. Davis, Helen L. Masin – 

Human communication
Semiotics
Interpersonal relationships
Nonverbal communication
Social graces